Zoe Rosenberg is an American animal rights activist and animal sanctuary founder. She participates in public forms of direct action at sporting and university events. In 2014, Rosenberg founded the Happy Hen Animal Sanctuary based in San Luis Obispo, California.

Early life and education 

Rosenberg was born in California to veterinarian Sherstin Rosenberg and entrepreneur Louis B. Rosenberg. She was raised in a vegetarian household and became vegan at the age of 11. In 2014, she founded the Happy Hen Chicken Rescue at age 11 which expanded over time to become the Happy Hen Animal Sanctuary. She now attends University of California Berkeley where she organizes protests against the University for its alleged ties to factory farms.

Activism 
In July 2016, Rosenberg was arrested at age 14 on live TV during a LA Dodgers baseball game for pitch invasion protesting the reported maltreatment of farm animals by a meat supplier used for "Dodger Dog" hotdogs sold at the stadium. Rosenberg recounted her arrest on the pitcher's mound at Dodger Stadium in a TEDx talk she gave at age 16 entitled "Taking the Mound."

During an October 2016 discussion hosted at the California Polytechnic State University, San Luis Obispo, she gave Whole Foods Market co-CEO Walter Robb a flower in protest of alleged animal deaths. In December 2017, Rosenberg protested outside the Charles Paddock Zoo. 

In February 2018, Rosenberg was a 15-year-old student at Olive Grove Charter School in San Luis Obispo, California. She was also an operator of her animal sanctuary and an animal rights activist. The same year, she was an organizer of the San Luis Obispo chapter of Direct Action Everywhere. 

In April 2018, she chained herself in protest to a slaughterhouse gate on the campus of the California Polytechnic State University, San Luis Obispo in an attempt to rescue a cow. Rosenberg and a 31-year-old women were arrested by university police who later issued them temporary stay-away orders. Rosenberg's mother was also arrested for allegedly contributing to the delinquency of a minor. No charges were filed by police. Rosenberg organized additional protests against the University aimed to shut down the on-campus slaughterhouse.

At the 2019 College Football Playoff National Championship, Rosenberg at age 16 rushed onto the field at Levi Stadium and unfurled a banner in protest of cruel and inhumane methods by a concession vendor and stadium meat supplier, Starbird and Petaluma Poultry. She was tackled and dragged off the field and questioned by police.

Rosenberg has been recognized as the youth activist of the year by the Animal Rights National Conference and received an Paul McCartney Veg Advocate Award.

As of August 2021, Rosenberg is a student at University of California, Berkeley and an investigator for Direct Action Everywhere.

On April 16, 2022, she was arrested for chaining herself to the basketball hoop during an NBA playoff game between the Memphis Grizzlies and Minnesota Timberwolves. The action was done in protest of Timberwolves owner Glen Taylor, whose factory farm allegedly "roasted birds alive" in a controversial mass kill method called "ventilation shutdown plus."

Dubbed "Chain Girl" by national media sources, Rosenberg was held overnight and then was released on bond. Her charges were dismissed in January of 2023. Candace Buckner, a Washington Post sports columnist and critic, called Rosenberg's ease in accessing the court during a playoff game an example of white privilege.

See also 

 List of animal rights advocates

References 

Living people
People from San Luis Obispo, California
American animal rights activists
Activists from the San Francisco Bay Area
American child activists
Keepers of animal sanctuaries
American women company founders
University of California, Berkeley alumni
Year of birth missing (living people)